Saint Telemachus (also Almachus or Almachius) was a monk who, according to the Church historian Theodoret, tried to stop a gladiatorial fight in a Roman amphitheatre, and was stoned to death by the crowd. The Christian Emperor Honorius, however, was impressed by the monk's martyrdom and it spurred him to issue a historic ban on gladiatorial fights. Frederick George Holweck gives the year of his death as 391.

Background
He is described as being an ascetic who came to Rome from the East. The story is found in the writings of Theodoret, Bishop of Cyrrhus, Syria.

Although the site of Telemachus' martyrdom is often given as being the Colosseum in Rome, Theodoret does not actually specify where it happened, saying merely that it happened in "the stadium".

Later retellings of the story have differed from Theodoret's in a number of details. Foxe's Book of Martyrs claims that Telemachus was first stabbed to death by a gladiator, but that the sight of his death "turned the hearts of the people". In the version of the story told by Ronald Reagan in 1984, the entire crowd left in silence.

There is also an alternate form of the story, in which Telemachus stood up in the amphitheatre and told the assembly to stop worshipping idols and offering sacrifices to the gods. Upon hearing this statement, the prefect of the city is said by this source to have ordered the gladiators to kill Telemachus, and they promptly did so.

Notes

External links
Telemachus: The Monk Who Ended the Coliseum Games
January 1, 404: Telemachus Martyred Attempting to Stop a Gladiator Fight | Church History Timelines

4th-century births
4th-century Romans
5th-century Romans
Christian hagiography
5th-century Christian martyrs
5th-century Christian saints
Year of death uncertain
People executed by stoning